Barbara Pentland C.M. (2 January 1912 – 5 February 2000) was one of the pre-eminent members of the generation of Canadian composers who came to artistic maturity in the years following World War Two.

Life and career
Born in Winnipeg, Manitoba, Pentland suffered from a heart disorder which significantly limited both her physical and social activities during her childhood. As a result, she devoted much of her time from an early age to academic pursuits and other intellectual activities. At the age of 9 she began studying the piano in her native city at the Rupert's Land Girls' School. She soon developed an interest in music composition but her early ventures into this area were strongly discouraged by both her teacher and her relatively wealthy and conservative family, who viewed the pursuit as an eccentric hobby that was "too exciting for a delicate child".

Despite her family's objections, Pentland continued to compose privately as a young teenager. She finally was encouraged in this pursuit by one of her teachers, the organist and conductor Frederick H. Blair, who taught her piano and music theory while she attended boarding school at Miss Edgar's and Miss Cramp's School in Montreal from 1927-1929. She then studied composition with family approval in Paris in 1929 with Cécile Gauthiez while attending a finishing school in that city; after which, she returned to her native city where she studied under Hugh Bancroft (organ) and Eva Clare (piano) from 1930–1936 and embarked on a career as a concert pianist.

In 1936, Pentland entered the graduate music program at the Juilliard School in New York City where she studied 16th-century counterpoint with Frederick Jacobi and modern composition techniques with Bernard Wagenaar through 1939. During these years, her own compositions took on a language that was primarily neoclassical, showing the influence of Paul Hindemith, Igor Stravinsky, and later Aaron Copland (with whom she studied with at the Tanglewood Music Center during the summers of 1941 and 1942). Her work was part of the music event in the art competition at the 1948 Summer Olympics.

Pentland's compositional language began to shift away from neoclassicism in 1955 when she encountered the work of Anton Webern for the first time while visiting Darmstadt. Although she never became a strict serial composer in Webern's manner, she did adapt elements of his style and technique into her new "free atonal" musical language. It is the work of this period which is regarded as her finest, being described by musicologist David Gordon Duke as music that "drew on the textures and organizational principles of the Webern school but was suffused with a lyricism that was expressly individual".

Although Pentland's position at the forefront of the Canadian musical avant-garde was recognized during her lifetime, her career was also marked by substantial struggle. As a woman composer of 'difficult' music, she met with resistance from male performers and was often treated dismissively by fellow composers.  Her academic career was relatively brief; she left her post at the University of British Columbia because of conflict with the department chair on the issue of academic standards. Following the end of her career (forced by ill health more than a decade before her death), Pentland fell into relative obscurity, overshadowed in discussions of Canadian music by her male contemporaries. Her works have nonetheless been recorded by such performers as Angela Hewitt (Studies in Line), Glenn Gould (Ombres/Shadows), and Robert Rogers (multiple works).

Pentland's centennial was celebrated with a 2012 concert series sponsored by the Canadian Music Centre (BC Region), and with a revival of her opera The Lake presented by Astrolabe Musik Theatre, the Turning Point Ensemble, and Westbank First Nation. That year, the CMC Centrediscs label also released Toccata, a recording of Pentland's compositions by pianist Barbara Pritchard.

Pentland was an early member of the Canadian Music Centre, which provides public access to a large number of her scores and recordings. Library and Archives Canada holds the Barbara Pentland fonds.

Pentland was appointed a Member of the Order of Canada in 1989, and a Member of the Order of British Columbia in 1993.

Selected works
 Studies in Line (1941) 
 Symphony No. 2 (1950) 
  (1957)
 Duo for Viola and Piano (1960)
 Variations for Viola Solo (1965)
 Disasters of the Sun (1976)
  (1983)

See also 
 Music of Canada
 List of Canadian composers

References

External links
 
 Barbara Pentland fonds at Library and Archives Canada
 CMC Composer Showcase: Barbara Pentland

1912 births
2000 deaths
20th-century Canadian composers
20th-century classical composers
20th-century women composers
Canadian classical composers
Women classical composers
Members of the Order of Canada
Musicians from Winnipeg
Olympic competitors in art competitions
Pupils of Aaron Copland
Canadian women composers